Cliff Brown may refer to:

 Cliff Brown (American football) (1952–2012), former American football quarterback for the University of Notre Dame
 Cliff Brown (soccer) (born 1956), American soccer goalkeeper